Yetu Microfinance Bank Plc. (YETU) is a microfinance bank in Tanzania. It is the first microfinance institution to be listed in the Dar es Salaam Stock Exchange. 
Yetu is a Swahili word meaning Ours.

Overview
The bank offers credit products, such as solidarity group loans for clients who are organized into groups whose members serve as informal bank and cross guarantee each other's loans; Mavuno loan products to afford members of solidarity group loan who have reached a loan ceiling of TSh 3 million and would like to borrower on individual capacity; small and medium enterprises loan products, including export and import, car, business/shop improvement, business capital, and processing and manufacturing loans; SRI agricultural loans; mixed farming loans to smallholder farmers for financing various crops; and instant loans, as well as education loans. Its deposit products comprise compulsory (collateral) savings; and voluntary deposits.

History
Yetu Microfinance Bank PLC is a public limited company that was incorporated under the Companies Act 2002 on December 23, 2013 so as to take over the business of Youth Self Employment Foundation (YOSEFO). YOSEFO was a credit only Microfinance institution for 14 years before being transformed into a microfinance bank. On 23 June 2015 Yetu Microfinance launched an initial public offering (IPO) through the Enterprise Growth Window (EGM) and was able to raise TSh 3.1 billion. On 10 March 2016 Yetu Microfinance PLC became the first and only microfinance listed at the Dar es Salaam Stock Exchange PLC. The company managed to secure a banking licence on 20 February 2017 from Bank of Tanzania after meeting licensing conditions including the minimum capital requirement of TSh 5 billion. The as of 2018, the current paid up capital of the bank is TSh 6.05 billion.

Corporate affairs 
The Board of Directors of the company comprises six individuals. The Chairman is one of the five non-Executive Directors. The current Chairman is Ernest Ndimbo and the current Managing Director and Chief Executive Officer (CEO), is Altemius Millinga.

Ownership
YOSEFO is a major shareholder of YETU Microfinance Bank PLC. YETU Microfinance has taken over from YOSEFO all the branches, agencies and clients. Yetu Microfinance sold 6,223,380 shares at the price of 500/- and managed to raise 3.1bn/- collected from 14,273 subscribers through an IPO.

Branches and Financial Service Centre Network
Yetu Microfinance Bank PLC has its headquarters in Dar es Salaam. As of 2019, the bank's distribution network was three branches (Mzizima and Mbagala in Dar es Salaam and Mngeta in Morogoro region) and 16 Financial Service Centers. All branches and financial service centers are linked on an online real-time basis system. Customers across Tanzania are also served through multiple delivery channels such as mobile banking, POS and ATM Cards. All the branches and financial service centres are fitted with biometric teller system, a technology friendly to the low-end market of the financial sector. The bank is also a member of Umoja Switch hence its customers can access over 300 ATMs country wide. , Yetu Microfinance Bank PLC maintains a network of branches and financial service centres (FSC) at the following locations:

 Head Office -   Dar es Salaam
 Mbagala Branch - Temeke District, Dar es Salaam 
 Mzizima Branch - Ilala District, Dar es Salaam
 Mngeta Branch - Kilombero District, Morogoro.
 Zanzibar FSC - Zanzibar
 Kilwa FSC - Kilwa.
 Lindi FSC - Lindi
 Lumo FSC - Temeke District, Dar es Salaam
 Kigamboni FSC - Kigamboni District, Dar es Salaam
 Kibaha FSC - Kibaha District, Pwani
 Ifakara FSC - Kilombero District, Morogoro
 Malinyi FSC - Malinyi District, Morogoro
 Masasi FSC - Masasi District, Mtwara
 Ruaha FSC - Kilombero District, Morogoro
 Amani FSC - Tanga

See also
 Microfinance in Tanzania
 Dar es Salaam Stock Exchange

References

Microfinance companies of Africa
Business in Africa
Finance in Tanzania
Finance in Africa